He is now retired due to injury 

Michel Ndahinduka (born 3 March 1990) is a Rwandan professional footballer who plays as a forward. he has also been a regular in the national team since 2013. The 24-year-old Ndahinduka holds the record of being the first ever player to be named in the senior national team (Amavubi stars) from a second tier league side.

International career

International goals
Scores and results list Rwanda's goal tally first.

References

External links 
 

1990 births
Living people
Rwandan footballers
Rwanda international footballers
Association football forwards
People from Bugesera District
Bugesera FC players
APR F.C. players
AS Kigali FC players